The Youngstown–Warren–Boardman, OH–PA Metropolitan Statistical Area, typically known as the Mahoning Valley, is a metropolitan area in Northeast Ohio and Western Pennsylvania with Youngstown, Ohio, at its center. According to the U.S. Census Bureau, the metropolitan statistical area (MSA) includes Mahoning and Trumbull counties in Ohio and Mercer County (the "Shenango Valley") in Pennsylvania. As of the 2020 census, the region had a population of 541,243, making it the 107th largest metro area in the country. 

Taking its name from the Mahoning River, the area has a large commuter population that works in Cleveland and Pittsburgh and their metropolitan areas. It is located in the Rust Belt, the former industrial region of the northern United States. The Youngstown–Warren combined statistical area adds the Salem micropolitan area and Columbiana County, Ohio to the region, increasing the total population to 643,120. The Youngstown–Warren media market serves all three counties in the CSA, as well as the New Castle micropolitan area.

Steel industry 
Although steel has been produced in the Mahoning Valley since the mid-1800s, after the Civil War, the valley was primarily known for its iron production. Conversion to steel manufacturing began during the economic depression of the 1890s. The Mahoning Valley is suitable for steel manufacture because of "its proximity to the Lake Erie ports that receive iron ore…the coal fields of Ohio, Pennsylvania and West Virginia; and to limestone deposits." The "25-mile stretch of steel mills and related industries" along the Mahoning River is similar to the Ruhr Valley in Germany." Historically, it was part of the largest steel producing region in the world, leading to the historical "Steel Valley" moniker that the area shared with the Pittsburgh metropolitan area. 

The local steel industry declined during the 1970s steel crisis. A notable plant closure occurred on September 19, 1977, when Youngstown Sheet and Tube abruptly closed its Campbell Works and furloughed 5,000 workers. Today the area produces little steel, and is home to many scrap metal yards and aluminum plants. A 2009 documentary, Steel Valley: Meltdown, addresses "the past, present and future of the Mahoning Valley" through the eyes of local experts, including one local organizer who stated, "We are the first generation completely removed from the days when steel mills were active."

The Mahoning Valley Economic Development Corporation, founded in 1979, is active in economic revitalization and diversification. It owns two industrial parks, and has purchased local rail lines, including the Youngstown and Austintown Railroad and the Warren and Trumbull Railroad.

Municipalities

Largest municipalities

Cities, villages, and boroughs 

Mahoning County
 Alliance (partly in Stark County)
 Austintown
 Beloit
 Berlin Center
 Boardman
 Campbell
 Canfield
 Craig Beach
 Lowellville
 Maple Ridge
 Mineral Ridge
 New Middletown
 Poland
 Sebring
 Struthers
 Youngstown

Trumbull County
 Cortland
 Girard
 Hubbard
 Newton Falls
 Niles
 Warren
 Lordstown
 McDonald
 Orangeville
 West Farmington
 Yankee Lake

Columbiana County (CSA)
 Columbiana
 East Liverpool
 East Palestine
 Hanoverton
 Leetonia
 Lisbon
 Minerva
 New Waterford
 Rogers
 Salem
 Salineville
 Summitville
 Washingtonville
 Wellsville

Mercer County
 Clark
 Farrell
 Fredonia
 Greenville
 Grove City
 Hermitage
 Jackson Center
 Jamestown
 Mercer
 New Lebanon
 Sandy Lake
 Sharon
 Sharpsville
 Sheakleyville
 Stoneboro
 West Middlesex
 Wheatland

Townships 

Mahoning County
 Austintown
 Beaver
 Berlin
 Boardman
 Canfield
 Coitsville
 Ellsworth
 Goshen
 Green
 Jackson
 Milton
 Poland
 Smith
 Springfield

Trumbull County
 Bazetta
 Bloomfield
 Braceville
 Bristol
 Brookfield
 Champion
 Farmington
 Fowler
 Greene
 Gustavus
 Hartford
 Howland
 Hubbard
 Johnston
 Kinsman
 Liberty
 Mecca
 Mesopotamia
 Newton
 Southington
 Vernon
 Vienna
 Warren
 Weathersfield

Columbiana County (CSA)
 Butler
 Center
 Elkrun
 Fairfield
 Franklin
 Hanover
 Knox
 Liverpool
 Madison
 Middleton
 Perry
 Salem
 St. Clair
 Unity
 Washington
 Wayne
 West
 Yellow Creek

Mercer County
 Coolspring
 Deer Creek
 Delaware
 East Lackawannock
 Fairview
 Findley
 French Creek
 Greene
 Hempfield
 Jackson
 Lackawannock
 Lake
 Liberty
 Mill Creek
 New Vernon
 Otter Creek
 Perry
 Pine
 Pymatuning
 Salem
 Sandy Creek
 Sandy Lake
 Shenango
 South Pymatuning
 Springfield
 Sugar Grove
 West Salem
 Wilmington
 Wolf Creek
 Worth

Demographics 

As of the census of 2000, there were 602,978 people, 238,319 households, and 162,896 families residing within the MSA. The racial makeup of the MSA was 86.88% White, 10.78% African American, 0.15% Native American, 0.45% Asian, 0.02% Pacific Islander, 0.55% from other races, and 1.17% from two or more races. Hispanic or Latino of any race were 1.70% of the population.

The median income for a household in the MSA was $36,071, and the median income for a family was $44,055. Males had a median income of $35,626 versus $23,186 for females. The per capita income for the MSA was $18,547.

Transportation

Airports
The Youngstown–Warren area is served by one regional and several county and local airports, including:
 Columbiana County Airport
 Koons Airport
 Lansdowne Airport
 Miller Airport
 Salem Airpark
 Warren Airport
 Youngstown Elser Metro Airport
 Youngstown–Warren Regional Airport
 Youngstown Air Reserve Station

Major highways 
  Interstate 76
  Interstate 79
  Interstate 80
  Interstate 376
  Interstate 680
  Ohio Turnpike
  U.S. Route 19
  U.S. Route 30
  U.S. Route 62
  U.S. Route 224
  U.S. Route 322
  U.S. Route 422

Public transit
The Western Reserve Transit Authority (WRTA) operates a metropolitan public busing system in Mahoning and Trumbull counties. In Columbiana County, the Community Action Rural Transit System (CARTS) operates a rural public busing system.

Colleges and universities

The Mahoning Valley is home to a number of higher education facilities, including:

 Butler County Community College (Hermitage)
 Eastern Gateway Community College (Youngstown)
 Grove City College (Grove City)
 Kent State University at East Liverpool (East Liverpool)
 Kent State University at Salem (Salem)
 Kent State University at Trumbull (Warren)
 New Castle School of Trades (East Liverpool)
 Pennsylvania State University Shenango (Sharon)
 Thiel College (Greenville)
 Youngstown State University (Youngstown)

Sports

NCAA Division I sports are played in the region, with Youngstown State University fielding eight men's and ten women's teams.

See also 
 Republic Steel
 Economy of Youngstown, Ohio

References

Further reading
 Blue, Frederick J.; Jenkins, William D.; Lawson, William H.; Reedy, Joan M. (1995). Mahoning Memories: A History of Youngstown and Mahoning County. Virginia Beach, VA: The Donning Company. .
 Ruminski,  Clayton J. Iron Valley: The Transformation of the Iron Industry in Ohio’s Mahoning Valley, 1802—1913 (Ohio State University Press, 2017).

 
Mahoning County, Ohio
Trumbull County, Ohio
Mercer County, Pennsylvania
Metropolitan areas of Ohio